Belura  is a village in the southern state of Karnataka, India. It is located in the Basavakalyan taluk of Bidar district. It comes under the Hulsoor Police jurisdiction.

Demographics
 India census, Belura had a population of 5857 with 2921 males and 2936 females.

See also
 Bidar
 Districts of Karnataka

References

External links
 http://Bidar.nic.in/

Villages in Bidar district